Rudderfish may refer to:

 Sea chubs, fish of the family Kyphosidae 
 Centrolophus niger, Black ruff or rudderfish
 Coryphaena pompilus
 Girella nigricans, Opaleye or rudderfish
 Icichthys lockingtoni, Medusafish or brown rudderfish
 Kyphosus bigibbus, Grey sea chub or rudderfish
 Kyphosus cinerascens, Blue seachub or rudderfish
 Kyphosus hawaiiensis, Insular rudderfish
 Kyphosus sandwicensis, Pacific rudderfish
 Kyphosus sectatrix, Bermuda chub or rudderfish
 Kyphosus vaigiensis, Brassy chub or rudderfish
 Proteracanthus sarissophorus, Sea chub or rudderfish
 Psenopsis anomala, Japanese butterfish or Pacific rudderfish
 Seriola zonata, Banded rudderfish
 Tubbia stewarti, Seamount rudderfish
 Tubbia tasmanica, Tasmanian ruffe or rudderfish

Fish common names